The 2001 Cork Intermediate Hurling Championship was the 92nd staging of the Cork Intermediate Hurling Championship since its establishment by the Cork County Board in 1909. The draw for the opening round fixtures took place on 10 December 2000. The championship began on 28 April 2001 and ended on 4 November 2001.

On 4 November 2001, Killeagh won the championship after a 3-09 to 2-08 defeat of Mallow in a final replay. It remains their only championship title in the grade.

Killeagh's Joe Deane was the championship's top scorer with 5-48.

Team changes

To Championship

Promoted from the Cork Junior A Hurling Championship
 Nemo Rangers

From Championship

Promoted to the Cork Senior Hurling Championship
 Douglas

Results

First round

Second round

 Cobh received a bye in this round.

Third round

Round 4

Quarter-finals

Semi-finals

Finals

Championship statistics

Top scorers

Overall

In a single game

References

Cork Intermediate Hurling Championship
Cork Intermediate Hurling Championship